Purbalingga Regency (Javanese: ꦥꦸꦂꦧꦭꦶꦁꦒ) is an inland regency in the southwestern part of Central Java province in Indonesia. Purbalingga Regency has an area of 777.64 km2 and population of 848,952 at the 2010 census and 998,561 at the 2020 census, comprising 505,281 male and 493,280 female inhabitants; the official estimate as at mid 2021 was 1,007,794. The administrative capital is the town of Purbalingga.

Etymology 
The term Purbalinga comes from the Sanskrit root words of Hindu origin, purba (east) and linga (an abstract representation of Hindu deity Lord Shiva), thus meaning the Lord Shiva of East. This reflects the historic origin of the place that the Srivijaya-era or earlier founders of the place had built a Hindu temple of the Lord Shiva here in whose honor the place was named by the founder ruling dynasty.

History 
Purbalingga is steeped in the ancient history of the Hindu empires of the Srivijaya and Majapahit era, with several following extant ancient Hindu temples scattered in and around the regency:
 in Tegal Regency
 Pura Caraka Dewa, Margo Padang, Tarub, Tegal.
 Pura Segara Suci, Jalan Timor Timur, Martologo, Tegal.
 Nearby in Cirebon Regency
 Pura Agung Jati Permana, Jalan Bali, No. 4, Cirebon.
 Pura Jati Permana, Desa Larangan, Rt 3/4, Harjomukti, Cirebon.
 Pura Jati Pramana, Jalan Ciremai Raya, Cirebon.

Administrative districts
Purbalingga Regency comprises eighteen districts (kecamatan), tabulated below with their areas and their populations at the 2010 census and the 2020 census, topgether with the official estimates as at mid 2021. The table also includes the locations of the district administrative centres, the number of administrative villages (a total of 224 rural desa and 15 urban kelurahan) in each district and its post code.

Notes: (a) comprising 224 rural desa and 15 urban kelurahan - the latter consist of 11 villages in Purlalingga (town) District, 3 in Kalimanah District and 1 in Padamara District. (b) except the village of Timbang, which has a post code of 53314. (c) except the village of Penaruban, which has a post code of 53331. (d) except the village of Kalikabong, which has a post code of 53321.

Gallery

Climate
Purbalingga Regency has a tropical rainforest climate (Af) with moderate rainfall from July to September and heavy to very heavy rainfall from October to June. The following climate data is for the town of Purbalingga.

Famous people
 Sudirman, General of the Army and the first commander-in-chief of the Indonesian Armed Forces - one of the most prominent national heroes of Indonesia - was born in Bodas Karangjati village, in the district of Rembang, Purbalingga Regency, on 24 January 1916.
 Indro (Warkop), (born 1958), Indonesian comedian and a member of the Indonesian legendary comedy group Warkop.

References

External links

 Official site of Local Government of Purbalingga Regency

Regencies of Central Java